John William Gurley (born May 10, 1966) is an American businessman. He is a general partner at Benchmark, a Silicon Valley venture capital firm in Menlo Park, California. He is listed consistently on the Forbes Midas List and is considered one of technology’s top dealmakers.

Education and early career
John William Gurley was born in Dickinson, Texas, outside of Houston, on May 10, 1966. Gurley graduated from the University of Florida in 1989 with a Bachelor of Science degree. While at the University of Florida, he was a member of the men’s basketball team. Gurley received his Masters of Business Administration degree from the University of Texas McCombs School of Business in 1993.

Prior to his investment career, Gurley was a design engineer at Compaq Computer, where he worked on products such as the 486/50 and Compaq's first multi-processor server. Before Compaq, he worked in the technical marketing group of Advanced Micro Devices' embedded processor division.

Gurley was a partner at Hummer Winblad Venture Partners. He had also spent four years on Wall Street as a research analyst, including three years at CS First Boston. He was considered “one of Wall Street’s premier technology analysts." He covered companies including Dell, Compaq and Microsoft and was the lead analyst on the Amazon.com IPO.

Benchmark
At Benchmark, Gurley has led investments in and holds board seats on Brighter, DogVacay, Good Eggs, GrubHub, HackerOne, Linden Lab, LiveOps, Nextdoor, OpenTable, Sailthru, Scale Computing, Stitch Fix, Vessel, and Zillow.

Other investments of his have included: Avamar Technologies (acquired by EMC Corporation), Business.com (acquired by R.H. Donnelley), Clicker.com (acquired by CBS Interactive), Demandforce (acquired by Intuit), Employease (acquired by Automatic Data Processing), JAMDAT Mobile (acquired by Electronic Arts), Nordstrom.com (acquired by Nordstrom), Shopping.com (acquired by eBay), The Knot, Uber, and Vudu (acquired by Walmart).

2008 recession 
With the economic collapse in the fall of 2008, Gurley garnered attention when he sent a letter to his portfolio companies, advising CEOs to exercise caution in spending but to look for and take advantage of opportunities that become available during harsh economic times. In a 2015 interview Gurley said of private tech investing, "It’s my belief that Silicon Valley and the venture-backed businesses have moved into a world that is both speculative and unsustainable." Gurley’s warnings, and posts on his personal blog, Above the Crowd, on venture capital spending, have been widely discussed in the industry. He also advises family offices to be careful before investing in unicorn companies.

In March 2016, Gurley was named VC of the Year at TechCrunch’s annual Crunchies awards.

Uber 
Gurley left Uber's board of directors in June 2017. The announcement was released one day after the company announced the resignation of CEO Travis Kalanick following months of controversy over Uber's corporate culture. An advisor for Uber during allegations of misconduct and sexual harassment, Gurley was reportedly instrumental in the resignation of CEO Travis Kalanick.

Gurley reportedly had a close relationship with CEO Travis Kalanick. He was Uber’s most engaged board member and the closest thing Mr. Kalanick has to a consigliere. Gurley shared his support for Kalanick on Twitter, stating "There will be many pages in the history books devoted to @travisk - very few entrepreneurs have had such a lasting impact on the world."

In April 2020, The Wall Street Journal reported that Gurley would be stepping back from Benchmark as he was not investing in a new fund that his venture capital firm was raising.

In popular culture 
A fictionalised version of Gurley portrayed by actor Kyle Chandler appeared in the Showtime drama series Super Pumped.

Personal life
Gurley is known for his above average height; he is 6’9”. The title of his blog, Above the Crowd, and the book eBoys: The First Inside Account of Venture Capitalists that profiles the Benchmark team, both reference his height; the subtitle of eBoys is “The true story of the six tall men who backed eBay, Webvan, and other billion-dollar start-ups."

Gurley is married with three children and currently lives in Atherton, California.

References

Further reading
Randall E. Stross, eBoys : The First Inside Account of Venture Capitalists at Work. (New York: Ballantine Books, 2000). .

External links
Bill Gurley on CNBC's TechCheck https://www.cnbc.com/video/2021/06/08/bill-gurley-on-the-ipo-market.html
Bill Gurley and Matt Cohler interview on TechCrunch
 Above the Crowd blog
 Bill Gurley on LinkedIn
 Official Forbes Profile

American financial businesspeople
Living people
University of Florida alumni
McCombs School of Business alumni
American venture capitalists
1966 births
People from Dickinson, Texas
Florida Gators men's basketball players
People from Atherton, California
CFA charterholders
Midas List